The Dresden Academy of Fine Arts (German Hochschule für Bildende Künste Dresden), often abbreviated HfBK Dresden or simply HfBK, is a vocational university of visual arts located in Dresden, Germany. The present institution is the product of a merger between the famous Dresden Art Academy, founded in 1764, the workplace and training ground of a number of influential European artists, and another well-established local art school, Hochschule für Werkkunst Dresden, after World War II.

History

Buildings

One of three buildings of today’s Dresden Academy of Fine Arts, the former Royal Academy of Arts, built in 1894, is located at a prominent position in town on Brühl's Terrace just next to the Frauenkirche. Since 1991, the building built by Constantin Lipsius on Brühl's Terrace between 1887 and 1894 – the glass dome of which is also known as Lemon Squeezer due to its form – has been heavily renovated and the parts that were destroyed during World War II were reconstructed. The studios for painting/graphic arts/sculpture/other artistic media, the graphic workshops, the rector's office and the exhibition rooms of the Academy, which house the annual graduation exhibitions of the graduates, are located on Brühl's Terrace.

On the side of the building facing the Elbe, the names of Pheidias, Iktinos, Praxiteles, Polykleitos, Lysippos, Erwin von Steinbach, Leonardo da Vinci, Michelangelo, Raphael and Dürer are inscribed on the wall and on the other side the motto "DEM VATERLAND ZU ZIER UND EHR" - "For the Honour and Adornment of the Fatherland" - is inscribed.

Apart from this magnificent building, the Academy owns the building for sculpture in Pfotenhauerstrasse, the studios and workshops of which were built in a big open-air exhibition ground in 1910. The workshops and studios for the courses of study of restoration, stage setting and costume design and the technical college degree course for theatre setting and costume design are located at Güntzstrasse in the buildings of the former Academy of Applied Arts.

Institution

Predecessors
In 1764, the “Allgemeine Kunst-Academie der Malerey, Bildhauer-Kunst, Kupferstecher- und Baukunst” (General Academy of Arts for Painting, Sculpture, Copperplate Engraving and Architecture) was founded by order of the Prince-Elector Frederick Christian. From 1768 to 1786 it was located in the Fürstenberg Palace. Its first director was the Frenchmen Charles Hutin. After the death of Hutin in 1776, Johann Eleazar Zeissig, referred to as Schenau, became alternating director of the Academy together with Giovanni Battista Casanova.

The Academy was the successor institution of the first “Zeichen- und Malerschule” (School for Drawing and Painters) founded in 1680. It was one of the oldest academies of art in the German-speaking area. In 1950 the Akademie der Bildenden Künste Dresden (Dresden Academy of Fine Arts) was merged with the Staatliche Hochschule für Werkkunst (Public Academy of Applied Art) – the successor of the Königlich Sächsische Kunstgewerbeschule (Royal Saxon School of Applied Art)– into today's "Hochschule für Bildende Künste Dresden” (Dresden Academy of Fine Arts).

Features
Today it is one of the academies of art in Germany that are especially attractive for a degree in art due to their unmistakable profile and optimum general conditions. The students are provided with spacious studies and well equipped workshops. The possibilities for exhibitions at the Academy are excellent: The Academy is provided with presentation space in the octagon below the glass dome referred to as “Lemon Squeezer” that is a landmark in the town, and in the two big adjacent exhibition rooms as well as the former library and the “Galerie Brühlsche Terrasse” (Brühl’s Terrace Gallery) which may be used by students from all degree courses and co-operation partners of the Academy.

The reorganisation of the Academy started in 1990 offered the chance for innovative and organic development of an academy with a long and successful history and distinct traditions. Well-known artists from the global world of art are teaching at the Academy. The different courses available for the study of painting and graphics as well as sculpture are very diverse. The classic cornerstones of artistic teaching at the Dresden Academy complemented and led to discourse and artistic exchange in the project class “New Media” and in a specialised course for comprehensive artistic works. The rules for study allow for changes within and between the specialized courses and for using the courses in the best possible way for one’s own artistic ambitions and projects.

Degree courses
The degree course of Bildende Kunst (Fine Art) consists of 10 semesters and leads to the Diplom degree. The degree course Kunsttechnologie, Konservierung und Restaurierung von Kunst- und Kulturgut (Art Technology, Preservation and Restoration of Artistic and Cultural Assets) is one of the oldest and most renowned education courses on university level in Germany. The degree course Bühnen- und Kostümbild (Stage Setting and Costume Design) and the technical college degree course Theaterausstattung (Theatre Setting and Costume Design) offer with their practical oriented integration of designing and realising disciplines conditions for work and study that are hard to find anywhere else.

The Laboratory Theatre in the Güntzstrasse completed in April 2000 which houses a well-equipped rehearsal and experimental stage room allows the Academy to provide the theatre courses as well with ideal teaching conditions in addition to the studios.

The new postgraduate course Kunst-Therapie (Art Therapy) that was established just a few years ago does only exist a second time at one other art academy in Germany. After their academy studies, artists and art teachers are given attractive new chances for qualification in the artistic-social field.

Notable alumni and former faculty

Former faculty members
One of its most illustrious teachers was Bernardo Bellotto, the painter of the world-famous town scapes of Dresden. At the beginning of the 19th century, painters such as Anton Graff and Adrian Zingg made the Dresden Academy one of the most important art schools in Europe. The engraver Johann Friedrich Wilhem Müller, author of a famous engraving of the Sistine Madonna after Raphael, was a professor at the Akademie from 1814 to 1816. Ernst Rietschel, Gottfried Semper and Ludwig Richter consolidated the reputation of the academy, which experienced a further zenith around the turn of the century. Many other eminent artists and scholars closely associated with the history of the Academy include Eugen Bracht, Giovanni Casanova, Caspar David Friedrich, Oskar Kokoschka, and Otto Dix, who taught at the Dresden Academy and shaped its profile.

Other former artist professors are:
 Karl Albiker
 Johan Christian Dahl
 Constantin Lipsius
 Richard Müller
 Georg Hermann Nicolai
 Moritz Retzsch
 Paul Wallot

famous artist presidents:
 Johannes Heisig (1989–91)

Alumni
Carl Gustav Carus, (1789–1869), German physiologist and painter
Otto Dix (1891–1969), German painter and printmaker
Conrad Felixmüller (1897–1977), German painter and printmaker
Fedor Flinzer (1832–1911), German author, educator, and illustrator
Hilde Goldschmidt (1897-1980), German painter and printmaker 
Tatyana Grosman (1904–1982), Russian American printmaker, and publisher
George Grosz (1893–1959), German painter and caricaturist
Eberhard Havekost (born 1967), German painter and stonemason
Friedrich Heyser (1857–1921), German painter
Kurt Hilscher (1904–1980), German commercial illustrator
Ludwig von Hofmann (1861–1945), German painter, graphic artist and designer
Wilhelm von Kügelgen (1802–1867), German painter and writer
Elfriede Lohse-Wächtler (1899–1940), German painter and graphic artist
Yana Milev, German philosopher, sociologist, and ethnographer
Otto Mueller (1874–1930), German painter and printmaker
Rolf Nesch (1893–1975), Norwegian printmaker, painter and sculptor
Bencho Obreshkov (1899–1970), Bulgarian painter
Hermann Prell (1854–1922), German history painter and sculptor
Richard Burde (1912 - 1998), German painter
Sandra Rauch (born 1967), German artist
Thomas Reichstein (born 1960), German sculptor
Adrian Ludwig Richter (1803–1884), German painter and etcher
Gerhard Richter (born 1932), German painter and photographer
Osmar Schindler (1869–1927), German painter
Cornelia Schleime (born 1953), German painter, performer, filmmaker and author
Sascha Schneider (1870–1927), German painter and sculptor
Kurt Schwitters, (1887–1948) German painter
Lasar Segall, (1891–1957), Brazilian painter, engraver and sculptor
Karl August Senff (1770–1838), Baltic German painter, engraver and art teacher
Hans Unger (1872–1936), German painter
Otto Kaule (1870–1948), German painter

Locations
The Dresden Academy of Fine Arts is located at three places along the Elbe river:
 Brühlsche Terrasse 1, Dresden-Altstadt
 Güntzstraße 34, Dresden
 Pfotenhauerstrasse 81/83, Dresden-Johannstadt

Each year in early June the graduation ceremonies and annual exhibitions are held at the locations on the Brühl Terrace and at Pfotenhauerstrasse.

See also

 List of universities in Germany

References

External links
 Hochschule für Bildende Künste Dresden
 Website of Students and Masters of the Fine Arts Department

 
Education in Dresden
1764 establishments in the Holy Roman Empire
Educational institutions established in 1764
Universities and colleges in Saxony